The Sistema de Trens Urbanos de Natal (Natal Urban Trains System) is the metropolitan train system of the Natal Metropolitan Region in Brazil. It is operated by the Companhia Brasileira de Trens Urbanos (CBTU).

It currently consists of 22 stations on a two-line system of 56 kilometres.  It was extended to 24 stations and 71 km on Jan 17 2023. Rodoviaria of Natal is not directly linked, but walkable, closest stations Bom Pastor and Cidade Esperança.

References

Metre gauge railways in Brazil
Rail transport in Brazil
Passenger rail transport in Brazil